Fabrice O, Joubert is a French film director and producer best known for his computer-animated short film, French Roast  (2008), for which he received critical acclaim and was nominated for an Academy Award for Best Animated Short Film at the 82nd Academy Awards.

Life and career 
Joubert was born in France and grew up in Paris where he graduated from the Gobelins Animation School after majoring in film studies at the Sorbonne University. He started his career in Los Angeles, hired by DreamWorks Animation in 1998 to work as an animator on their first 2D animated feature The Prince of Egypt, and honed his skills in traditional and cg animation on their next five movies “

In 2007, he settled in Paris to write and direct his first short animated film French Roast. The film was screened throughout the world and won multiple awards before being nominated for an Oscar in 2010. In 2013, he moved back to Los Angeles to work for Illumination Entertainment (Despicable Me, Minions, The Secret Life of Pets, Sing ...). There, he directed a series of short films and commercials.

In 2019, Fabrice wrote, directed and produced his first live action short film "Safety".

Filmography 
Fabrice worked on many different films, formats and techniques, here is a list of the film he worked on:

 1998: The Prince of Egypt – Animator
 2000: The Road to El Dorado – Animator
 2002: Spirit: Stallion of the Cimarron – Animator
 2003: Sinbad: Legend of the Seven Seas – Supervising Animator
 2004: Shark Tale – Supervising Animator
 2005: Wallace & Gromit in The Curse of the Were-Rabbit – Stop-Motion Animator
 2006: Flushed Away – Supervising Animator
 2008: French Roast – Writer, Director
 2008: Star Wars: The Clone Wars - animator of Lucasfilm Animation France
 2010: Despicable Me – Character Animation Lead
 2011: A Monster in Paris – Animation Director
 2012: The Lorax – Lead Animator
 2013: Despicable Me 2 – Story Artist
 2013: Panic in the Mailroom – Co-Director
 2015: Binky Nelson Unpacified – Co-Director
 2019: Safety (live action) – Director, Writer, Producer

References

External links 
 

Living people
French film producers
French film directors
Year of birth missing (living people)